Mohamed Soltani is a Tunisian Olympic boxer. He represented his country in the featherweight division at the 1992 Summer Olympics. He won his first bout against Davis Lusimbo, and then lost his second bout to Eddy Suarez.

References

1967 births
Living people
Tunisian male boxers
Olympic boxers of Tunisia
Boxers at the 1992 Summer Olympics
Featherweight boxers
20th-century Tunisian people